Timbs v. Indiana, 586 U.S. ___ (2019), was a United States Supreme Court case in which the Court dealt with the applicability of the excessive fines clause of the Constitution's Eighth Amendment to state and local governments in the context of asset forfeiture.

In February 2019, the Court unanimously ruled that the Eighth Amendment's prohibition of excessive fines is an incorporated protection applicable to the states under the Fourteenth Amendment.

Legal background 
As formulated, the United States Bill of Rights was meant to restrict the power of only the federal government, not the state or local governments, which was confirmed by the US Supreme Court in Barron v. Baltimore (1833). However, following the American Civil War, Congress ratified the Fourteenth Amendment which included the Due Process Clause, "[N]or shall any State deprive any person of life, liberty, or property, without due process of law". Since its ratification, the United States Supreme Court has followed the  doctrine of incorporation: generally, all Constitutional rights must also be respected at state and local levels across a range of those rights, with the last such ruling on the topic of incorporation made in McDonald v. City of Chicago (2010), relating to the Second Amendment. The Court has carved out only specific exceptions to the doctrine for certain judicial procedural matters. However, the Supreme Court has never made a judgment broadly related to incorporation towards all parts of the Constitution; what Constitutional rights are incorporated to states have been set by specific cases, and the Court had yet to rule specifically on the Eighth Amendment's excessive fines clause.

In more recent years, the question of whether the Eighth Amendment's protection against excessive fines applies to state and local laws has been highlighted by the growing use of asset forfeiture, a tactic used since the start of the war on drugs in the mid-1970s to seize cash and material property used in illegal drug transactions. Cash assets are used to help fund law enforcement departments, but it has been found that seized assets like vehicles and homes are sometimes used for personal gain by law enforcers. It has been argued that the use of asset forfeiture is imbalanced against poor people, who are more likely to be caught in drug trafficking and have the fewest assets to lose, and makes it difficult for such people to reintegrate with society without these assets.

The Supreme Court previously ruled in Austin v. United States (1993) that the Eighth Amendment applies to federal asset forfeitures, protecting citizens from excessive fines that would include asset forfeiture. In the Supreme Court's 2017 term, a petition for a case related to state-level asset forfeiture had been submitted but the Court was forced to reject it since the petitioner had brought up the Eighth Amendment argument only within the writ of certiorari, which made the case ineligible for the Court. However, Justice Clarence Thomas, in his concurrence to the rejection of the petition, established several factors of why state and local asset forfeiture laws should be re-examined under the Eighth Amendment and identified similar criticism regarding the unbalanced nature towards the poor.

Case background 
Tyson Timbs of Indiana received a cash sum of money from his father's life insurance company upon his father's death in early 2012. However, Timbs, who had been a former drug addict, fell back to drugs following his father's death, and spent much of the remaining sum on illegal drug purchases as well as participating in drug sales to support his habit. The state, however, also used their forfeiture law to confiscate the Land Rover as a civil action, as Timbs had used the vehicle to transport the drugs. Following his year of house arrest, Timbs found it difficult to get back into society without a vehicle; though he ultimately found a job that accepted his criminal history, it required him to borrow a neighbor's car to make the commute.

Timbs, represented by the Institute for Justice, filed suit against the state, arguing that seizing of the vehicle violated the Eighth Amendment's prohibition against excessive fines. A Grant County Superior Court judge ruled in Timbs' favor, finding that the value of the Land Rover was over four times the maximum penalty Timbs could have been fined, and thirty times over the fines he actually paid, and thus was an excessive fine in the context of the Eighth Amendment. The Indiana Court of Appeals agreed with this ruling on appeal from the state.

However, at the Indiana Supreme Court, the decision was reversed. The Court argued that the Eighth Amendment only applies for federal actions and does not prohibit state or local laws from imposing  excessive fines, and that the Supreme Court had yet to issue any decision that incorporated the excessive fines clause of the Eighth Amendment to the states.

Supreme Court 
Timbs petitioned the US Supreme Court to hear his case, focused on answering the question of whether the "excessive fines" of the Eighth Amendment apply to state and local governments as through the Due Process Clause. The Court accepted the case in June 2018. Timbs' case received bipartisan support. Among those filing amicus briefs in support of Timbs included the American Civil Liberties Union, the NAACP Legal Defense and Educational Fund, the National Association of Criminal Defense Lawyers, Judicial Watch, and Pacific Legal Foundation. The United States Chamber of Commerce also filed a brief in support, arguing that just as individuals are harmed by unreasonable asset seizure, companies often end up incurring large fines under state and local laws for small violations.

Oral arguments were heard on November 28, 2018. Observers believed that on the constitutional question, the Justices were weighed heavily in favor of asserting that the excessive fines clause was another right that should be incorporated to states. However, these observers also believed that while the question did favor Timbs' case, the Court appeared to be ready to vacate the Indiana Supreme Court decision and rehear the case to determine if the forfeiture of the vehicle was to be considered as an excessive fine.

The Court issued its decision on February 20, 2019, unanimously stating that the Eighth Amendment's protection from excessive fines was incorporated against the states. The opinion was written by Justice Ruth Bader Ginsburg with all but Clarence Thomas joining, stating that the Eighth Amendment is incorporated to states under the Due Process Clause of the Fourteenth Amendment. Ginsburg's opinion referred to the protection from excessive fines as a key right as early as Magna Carta, and that this protection "has been a constant shield throughout Anglo-American history: Exorbitant tolls undermine other constitutional liberties". Justice Thomas wrote an opinion concurring in the judgment that protection from excessive fines is incorporated, but did not accept that the Due Process Clause was the right constitutional reason for this but generally as part of Privileges or Immunities Clause defined by the Fourteenth Amendment. Justice Neil Gorsuch, though joining on the majority opinion, also wrote a similar concurring opinion, stating that the incorporation was best defined as part of the Privileges or Immunities Clause. The Court vacated the Indiana Supreme Court's decision, and remanded Timbs' case to be reheard.

The Supreme Court did not offer any tests in their opinions as to how to measure when fines are deemed excessive, a matter that is expected to require additional case law to establish. Ginsburg's opinion did suggest that the seizure of Timbs' Land Rover was disproportionate to the crime, but this was to be resolved by the lower court.

Subsequent events
Timbs' case was reheard by the Grant County Court, which on April 27, 2020 ruled in Timbs' favor based on the Supreme Court's ruling related to the Eighth Amendment, that seizure of the Land Rover was an excessive fine, and ordered the Land Rover returned to Timbs. While the state appealed the decision, it did agree to return the vehicle on the condition that Timbs would not sell or give it away as the case continued in court.

The State of Indiana again appealed the decision all the way to the Indiana Supreme Court, who this time affirmed in a 4–1 decision the lower courts' rulings that the fine was unconstitutional. They wrote, "today, we reject the State's request to overturn precedent, as there is no compelling reason to deviate from stare decisis and the law of the case; and we conclude that Timbs met his burden to show gross disproportionality, rendering the Land Rover's forfeiture unconstitutional."

Impact
The Court's ruling is expected to affect the use of asset forfeiture at state and local levels, a common practice to help partially fund police forces. There is also speculation by supporters of criminal justice reform that the decision may  affect the use of confiscation of driver's licenses to compel payment of fines and fees, as well as imprisoning those unable to pay bail or fines for otherwise minor crimes.

See also
 Nebraska v. One 1970 2-Door Sedan Rambler (Gremlin)

References

External links

 

2019 in United States case law
United States Supreme Court cases
United States Supreme Court cases of the Roberts Court
Excessive Fines Clause case law
United States civil forfeiture case law
Incorporation case law